Rho Orionis, Latinised from ρ Orionis, is the Bayer designation for an orange-hued binary star system in the equatorial constellation of Orion. It is visible to the naked eye with an apparent visual magnitude of +4.44. The star shows an annual parallax shift of 9.32 mas due to the orbital motion of the Earth, which provides a distance estimate of roughly 350 light-years from the Sun. It is moving away from the Sun with a radial velocity of +40.5 km/s.

This is a single-lined spectroscopic binary system with an orbital period of 2.8 years and an eccentricity of 0.1. The visible component is an evolved giant star of type K with a stellar classification of K0 III. It has 2.67 times the mass of the Sun and is about 650 million years old.

Notes

References

K-type giants
Spectroscopic binaries
Orion (constellation)
Orionis, Rho
Durchmusterung objects
Orionis, 17
033856
024331
1698